Anomalosa is a genus of spiders in the family Lycosidae. It was first described in 1960 by Roewer. , it contains 2 Australian species.

References

Lycosidae
Araneomorphae genera
Spiders of Australia
Taxa named by Carl Friedrich Roewer